Moody is a city located in St. Clair County, Alabama, United States. The city was founded in 1907, and it was named after a local businessman named Epps Moody. It is located about 22 miles east of Birmingham and has a population of approximately 12,000 people. The city covers an area of 24.5 square miles, with a land area of 24.3 square miles and a water area of 0.2 square miles.

In the early days, the city was primarily an agricultural community, with cotton and timber being the main crops. However, with the arrival of the railroad in the early 20th century, Moody began to grow and develop into a more industrialized city. Today, the city is home to a number of industries, including manufacturing, healthcare, and retail.

The city hosts several events throughout the year, including the Moody Bluegrass Festival, which features live bluegrass music, arts and crafts, and food vendors. Other events include the Moody Miracle League Baseball Tournament, which raises money for the Miracle League of St. Clair County, and the Annual Christmas Parade.

Moody has a number of public and private schools. The Moody City School District operates two elementary schools, one middle school, and one high school. Additionally, there are several private schools in the area, including the Gathering Place Christian Academy and Heritage Independent School. For higher education, the city is located near several colleges and universities, including the University of Alabama at Birmingham and Samford University.

The most recent mayoral election was held in 2020 between incumbent mayor Joe Lee and challenger Connor York. The race was closely contested, with York ultimately winning by a margin of 105 votes. York, a Republican, was inaugurated as mayor in November 2020 and has since been serving in the position. Mayor York will be up for reelection in August 2024.

Geography
Moody is located at  (33.592469, -86.496369).

The city is located east of Birmingham along Interstate 20, which runs through the southern part of the city. Access can be found from exits 144 and 147. Via I-20, downtown Birmingham is 22 mi (35 km) west, and Atlanta is 127 mi (204 km) east. U.S. Route 411 also passes through the city, leading northeast 23 mi (37 km) to Ashville and southwest 5 mi (8 km) to Leeds.

Demographics

2010 census
As of the 2010 census, there were 20,017 people, 5,816 households, and 344 families residing in the city. The racial makeup of the town was 94.09% White, 3.81% African American, 0.42% Native American, 0.22% Asian, 0.37% from other races, and 1.08% from two or more races. 1.09% of the population were Hispanic or Latino of any race.

There were 3,126 households, out of which 34.6% had children under the age of 18 living with them, 60.8% were married couples living together, 10.6% had a female householder with no husband present, and 25.1% were non-families. 22.2% of all households were made up of individuals, and 8.1% had someone living alone who was 65 years of age or older. The average household size was 2.58 and the average family size was 3.02.

In the town, the population was spread out, with 26.2% under the age of 18, 7.8% from 18 to 24, 31.6% from 25 to 44, 23.6% from 45 to 64, and 10.7% who were 65 years of age or older. The median age was 36 years. For every 100 females, there were 95.6 males. For every 100 females age 18 and over, there were 90.8 males.

The median income for a household in the town was $39,500, and the median income for a family was $43,767. Males had a median income of $38,150 versus $26,089 for females. The per capita income for the town was $18,208. About 12.0% of families and 12.6% of the population were below the poverty line, including 13.9% of those under age 18 and 12.2% of those age 65 or over.

2020 census

As of the 2020 United States census, there were 13,170 people, 4,930 households, and 3,516 families residing in the city.

Education

Public schools 
Administered by the St. Clair County Board of Education:
 Moody Elementary School
 Moody Middle School
 Moody Jr. High School
 Moody High School

Private schools 
 Gathering Place Christian Academy—Pre-K - 8th Grade
 Crossroads Christian School—Homeschooling Co-op; Pre-K - 12th Grade

Notable people
Chad Slade - one-time Auburn national champion, two-time SEC champion, member of the New York Giants' active roster

References

External links

Cities in St. Clair County, Alabama
Cities in Alabama
Birmingham metropolitan area, Alabama